Chelmsford is a city in Essex, England.

Chelmsford may also refer to:

Australia 
 Chelmsford, Queensland, a locality in the Southern Burnett Region
 Chelmsford Royal Commission, an Australian investigation into the Chelmsford Private Hospital.

Canada 
 Chelmsford, New Brunswick
 Chelmsford, Ontario

United Kingdom 
 Chelmsford, the county town of Essex, England
 Chelmsford (UK Parliament constituency)
 Chelmsford City F.C., a football club in the above town
 Chelmsford railway station, a railway station in the above town
 City of Chelmsford, a local government district
 Chelmsford 123, a sitcom set in the above town
 Maldon and East Chelmsford (UK Parliament constituency)
 West Chelmsford (UK Parliament constituency)
 Viscount Chelmsford, in the Peerage of the United Kingdom
 Frederic Thesiger, 2nd Baron Chelmsford, known for command during the Anglo-Zulu War
 Frederic Thesiger, 1st Viscount Chelmsford

United States 
 Chelmsford, Massachusetts, Middlesex County, United States
 Chelmsford High School, a high school in the above town

Names with Chelmsford 

 Lord Chelmsford, British Army officer during the Anglo-Zulu War